Phebe Starr is an Electropop singer/songwriter from Australia.

Career

Starr began her career on Australian radio station Triple J. She released a debut single "Alone With You", which was favourably reviewed by ABC and The Age magazine, Her single has been placed in a Samsung commercial, the 2015 film A Million Happy Nows, and the television series Dance Academy and Offspring. Soon after, she released an EP, Zero.

Since then, Starr has received airplay from Triple J. She has also opened for Of Monsters and Men, Jagwar Ma, The Rubens, and Paperkites, in addition to touring both Australia and the US. Starr has been featured in Harper's Bazaar, Glamour, and Interview, and by Perez Hilton.

In 2016, Starr released a single, "Feel My Love", and performed in several venues in New York City. She appeared at The Foundry in Brisbane with Tigertown. She also performed at the SXSW Festival in Austin, Texas. In September, Starr's song "Feel My Love" won an award in the adult album alternative category by the International Unsigned Music Awards.

Discography

Albums
 Heavy Metal Flower Petal (2022)

EPs
 Zero (2013)
 Phebe Starr on Audiotree Live (2016)
 Chronicles (2017)
 Ice Tea Liberace (2019)

Singles
 "Alone With You" (2012)
 "Jurassica" (2013)
 "Tonight" (2014)
 "Feel My Love" (2016)
 “WONDER” (2017)
 “TOUCH XXX” (2019)
 “DAFFODILS” (2020)
 “Alphabet Soup” (2020)
 “Ode to the Alien” (2020)
 “Rollercoaster Man” (2021)
 “Air” (2021)
 “Edelweiss” (2021)
 “Everything” (2022)

As featured artist
 "The Night" - Capetown single (2014)

References

External links

Australian women singer-songwriters
Australian electronic musicians
Year of birth missing (living people)
Living people